Micaria longispina is a species of ground spider in the family Gnaphosidae. It is found in the United States and Canada.

References

Gnaphosidae
Articles created by Qbugbot
Spiders described in 1911